Atriplex fruticulosa is a species of saltbush known by the common names ball saltbush and little oak orach.

Distribution
It is endemic to California, where it grows in several types of habitat, usually in areas of saline or alkaline soils.

Description
This is a perennial herb producing an erect stem which branches in the upper half and reaches a maximum height near 50 centimeters. The gray scaly leaves are lance-shaped to narrowly oval and less than 2 centimeters in length. The plant produces spikelike inflorescences of male flowers and small clustered inflorescences of female flowers in the leaf axils.

References

External links
Jepson Manual Treatment
USDA Plants Profile
Flora of North America
Photo gallery

fruticulosa
Halophytes
Endemic flora of California
Flora of the California desert regions
Plants described in 1892
Flora without expected TNC conservation status